Walery Roman (1877-1952) was a Polish lawyer and politician. His early government career was related to the creation of the Regency Kingdom. Supported of Józef Piłsudski. In the aftermath of World War I he was involved in the establishment of Polish judiciary in the Suwałki region, and negotiations between Poland, Lithuania and Germany (Ober-Ost); in 1921 received the honorary citizenship of Suwałki. Voivode of the Polesie Voivodeship from 1921 to 1922, Polish government's delegate to Republic of Central Lithuania in 1922-1924 during the region's transformation into the Wilno Voivodeship. Participant of Piłsudski's May Coup of 1926; deputy to Polish parliament from sanacja's the Nonpartisan Bloc for Cooperation with the Government (BBWR) party until 1935. Retired from politics afterwards, continued his career as a lawyer until 1950.

1877 births
1952 deaths
People from Kalvarija, Lithuania
Nonpartisan Bloc for Cooperation with the Government politicians
20th-century Polish lawyers